Udea ruckdescheli is a species of moth in the family Crambidae. It was described from specimens collected on Crete, formerly identified as respectively Udea fulvalis and Udea languidalis ab veneralis.

Description of U. ruckdescheli as new species is based on the results of DNA barcoding and morphological examination.

References

Moths described in 2016
Moths of Europe
ruckdescheli